Myriogenospora aciculispora is a fungal plant pathogen. It has been reported to cause disease among sugarcane in Brazil.

References

Fungal plant pathogens and diseases
Clavicipitaceae
Fungi described in 1926